Sergei Yuryevich Pestryakov (born 26 January 1989) is a former Russian professional football player.

Club career
He played in the Russian Football National League for FC KAMAZ Naberezhnye Chelny in 2011.

External links
 
 Career summary at sportbox.ru
 

1989 births
Footballers from Moscow
Living people
Russian footballers
Association football midfielders
FC KAMAZ Naberezhnye Chelny players
FC Sportakademklub Moscow players